Chance Encounter may refer to:
 Chance Encounter (advert), an advert for Impulse body mist
 Chance Encounter (album), a 1982  album by Ramsey Lewis